Lawrence Raymond James Eckhoff (born 19 May 1952 in Dunedin) is a former New Zealand cricketer. 

A right-arm fast-medium bowler, Eckhoff played one first-class and one List A cricket match for Otago in the 1975-76 season. In his List A match against Canterbury, he took the only two Canterbury wickets to fall, those of Barry Hadlee and Peter Coman. 

In ten years of A grade cricket in Dunedin he took 427 wickets at an average of 17.2. He moved to Australia after accepting an offer from the Sturt Cricket Club in Adelaide. He was a member of the Sturt team that won the premiership in 1979. He left Sturt in 1981 to take up a playing coach position at Port Adelaide Cricket Club, and in 1985 returned to Sturt.

See also
 List of Otago representative cricketers

References

1952 births
Living people
New Zealand cricketers
Otago cricketers
Cricketers from Dunedin